"All I Know" is a 1973 song by Art Garfunkel.

All I Know may also refer to:

 All I Know (EP), by Conrad Sewell, 2015
 "All I Know" (Karnivool song), 2010
 "All I Know" (Matrix & Futurebound song), 2012
 "All I Know" (Screaming Trees song), 1996
 "All I Know" (The Weeknd song), 2016
 "All I Know", a song by Max, 1974
 "All I Know", a song by Machine Gun Kelly from Tickets to My Downfall, 2020